Everaldo Silva do Nascimento (born 28 May 1994), simply known as Everaldo, is a Brazilian professional footballer, Currently in America Mineiro, emprestado pelo Corinthians

Club career
Born in Olinda, Everaldo made his senior debut with América-PE in 2014 and went on to play for Boa, Mogi Mirim, Sâo Jose, Serra Talhada (on loan) and Velo Clube in the following years.

On 10 May 2017, Everaldo was loaned out to São Bento, in Série C. On 23 November, his loan deal was extended for the upcoming season.

On 17 July 2018, Everaldo rescinded his contract with São Bento and joined Série A side Fluminense until the end of 2019 Campeonato Carioca. On 20 September, he scored his first goal for the club in a 2–0 victory against Deportivo Cuenca, in Copa Sudamericana. He scored his first league goal four days later, in a 2–1 win against Chapecoense.

Corinthians
In May 2019, he signed a four-year contract with Corinthians.

References

External links
Everaldo at Fluminense website

1994 births
Living people
Association football forwards
Brazilian footballers
Campeonato Brasileiro Série A players
Campeonato Brasileiro Série B players
Campeonato Brasileiro Série C players
América Futebol Clube (PE) players
Boa Esporte Clube players
Mogi Mirim Esporte Clube players
Serra Talhada Futebol Clube players
Clube Atlético Joseense players
Associação Esportiva Velo Clube Rioclarense players
Esporte Clube São Bento players
Fluminense FC players
Sport Club Corinthians Paulista players
Sport Club do Recife players
América Futebol Clube (MG) players